Two the Hard Way is a studio album by American singer-actress Cher and the third studio album by American rock singer Gregg Allman released in November 1977 by Warner Bros. Records. The album, billed to "Allman and Woman", was a critical and commercial failure.

History 
The product of the two musicians' unlikely and turbulent relationship and marriage, it attempted an even more unlikely musical melding of Allman's Southern rock with Cher's idiosyncratic, personality-driven pop. The uncharacteristically airbrushed cover notwithstanding, Allman's musical ideas and singing generally took the lead.

In conjunction with the release of the album Cher and Allman did a 21-show tour called the "Two the Hard Way Tour", consisting of seven shows in Japan and 14 in Europe.  The tour ended abruptly when Cher parted ways with Allman and returned to the United States.

The album was not well received; the 1979 Rolling Stone Record Guide said "It's hard to imagine a more inappropriate combination ... It's the bottom of the barrel after a long fall for Gregg, and more of the same for Cher," and rated the album "Worthless". Two the Hard Way was not a commercial success either; by the time the 1983 edition of the same guide was published, the album was out of print.

The album was never officially re-issued on CD or 8-track, although it has been bootlegged. In 2008, Billboard correspondent Keith Caulfield stated that Cher owned the rights to the master tapes of this album (as well as three solo albums she made in the mid-1970s) and hence she would have to approve any reissues. The song "Can You Fool?" was included in the 1989 Allman Brothers compilation album Dreams, which is still in print.

For many years "Can You Fool?" was the only Allman and Woman song to have been officially made available online.  However, on October 8, 2021, Cher released all 11 tracks, "restored and remastered", on her YouTube channel.  A few days later, she also released several live videos produced in November 1977 for the BBC TV series, The Old Grey Whistle Test.

Track listing

Personnel
Cher – lead vocals, harmony vocals
Gregg Allman – lead vocals, harmony vocals, organ, producer
Ricky Hirsch, John Leslie Hug, Fred Tackett, Scott Boyer – guitar
Willie Weeks – bass 
Neil Larsen – piano, electric piano, clavinet, organ
Randall Bramblett, Harvey Thompson, Ronnie Eades – saxophone
Harrison Calloway, Jim Horn – horn
Ben Cauley – trumpet, flugelhorn
Dennis Good – trombone
Mickey Raphael – harmonica
Bobbye Hall – percussion
Bill Stewart – drums
Clydie King, Doug Hayward, Pat Henderson, Russell Morris, Sherlie Matthews, Tim Schmit – backing vocals
Jimmy Webb – string and horn arrangements on "We're Gonna Make It" and "Do What You Gotta Do"
Ed Freeman – string arrangements
Sid Sharp – concertmaster

Technical
Johnny Sandlin – producer
John Haeny – producer on "You Really Got a Hold On Me" and "Do What You Gotta Do"
Tom Flye – engineer
David Pinkston – engineer
John Cabalka – art direction
Brad Kanawyer – design
Bob Jacobs – artwork, photo hand tinting
Harry Langdon – photography

References

External links
Official Cher site
Official Gregg Allman site
Warner official site

1977 albums
Cher albums
Gregg Allman albums
Vocal duet albums
Albums arranged by Jimmy Webb
Warner Records albums